The Museum of Saint Helena is a museum on the island of Saint Helena, a British Overseas Territory in the south Atlantic Ocean. It has an extensive collection covering the maritime, military and social history of the island over two floors. It also has a small gift and book shop and an adjoining gallery for temporary exhibits.

The museum is managed by the Saint Helena Heritage Society.  It is housed in a late-18th-century stone building, formerly the old power station, at the foot of the hillside stairway, Jacob's Ladder, in lower Jamestown, Saint Helena's capital.  It was officially opened on 21 May 2002, the quincentennial anniversary of the island's discovery, by the Governor, David Hollamby.

The museum is one of two on the island, the other being Longwood House, the house that Napoleon Bonaparte stayed in during his incarceration on St Helena.

Gallery

References

External links

 Museum of Saint Helena website

Museums established in 2002
Museums in Saint Helena
Museum of Saint Helena
Museum of Saint Helena
Jamestown, Saint Helena